The Sigma 20mm F1.4 DG HSM Art is an interchangeable wide angle lens announced by Sigma Corporation on October 16, 2015.

Much like the similar 24mm F1.4, it is designed for wide angle photography with shallow depth of field. At full aperture, it has similar focus depth to a 35mm at f/2.8.

References
http://www.dpreview.com/products/sigma/lenses/sigma_20_1p4/specifications

020mm F1.4 DG HSM Art
Camera lenses introduced in 2015